The Strathmartine Castle Stone is a class I Pictish stone from Strathmartine, Angus, Scotland.

Description

The stone is of Old Red Sandstone and bears two pictish symbols, the Pictish beast and the crescent and v-rod. It was formerly built into a wall south east of Strathmartine Castle, but moved to a property in Dundee in the early 20th century. It was acquired for Dundee Museums in 1969 and is now on display at the McManus Galleries in Dundee.

References

External links
Entry in RCAHMS Canmore database

Pictish stones
Pictish stones in Angus, Scotland